Wilson Canfield Edsell (July 8, 1814 – August 12, 1900) served in the Michigan Senate, representing Allegan County, in 1865–1866, 1877–1878, and 1881–1882.

Edsell was the son of Jesse Edsell and Polly Canfield.  He was born in Pike, Pennsylvania on July 8, 1814 and raised on a farm attending common (public) schools.  In 1835, he enrolled at Oberlin College and helped found Olivet College in 1843.  He served the college as a trustee, secretary, and treasurer for six years before settling in Otsego, Michigan in 1849.  He made his living there as a lawyer, justice, and Michigan Asylum trustee.  His party affiliation was Republican initially, but later converted to the Prohibitionist party.

Edsell was the founder of the first National Bank in Otsego, as well as the sole contributor to the construction and provision of the town's Opera House.  He died August 12, 1900 at Otsego, Michigan.

References

1814 births
1900 deaths
People from Bradford County, Pennsylvania
Oberlin College alumni
Olivet College
People from Otsego, Michigan
Michigan lawyers
Michigan state senators
American bankers
19th-century American politicians
19th-century American lawyers
19th-century American businesspeople